Massachusetts held its elections November 5, 1810. Massachusetts law required a majority for election.  This was not met in the  necessitating a second election on April 1, 1811.

See also 
 Massachusetts's 10th congressional district special election, 1810
 Massachusetts's 11th congressional district special election, 1810
 Massachusetts's 4th congressional district special election, 1811
 United States House of Representatives elections, 1810 and 1811
 List of United States representatives from Massachusetts

Notes 

1810
Massachusetts
Massachusetts
United States House of Representatives
United States House of Representatives